Yousef Hani Ballan (Arabic:يوسف هاني بلان) (born 9 December 1996) is a Qatari footballer. He currently plays for Al-Markhiya.

References

External links
 

Qatari footballers
1996 births
Living people
Qatar SC players
Al-Shahania SC players
Al-Markhiya SC players
Aspire Academy (Qatar) players
Qatar Stars League players
Qatari Second Division players
Association football forwards